The Crown Equerry is the operational head of the Royal Mews of the Royal Household of the Sovereign of the United Kingdom. He is responsible for the provision of vehicular transport for the Sovereign, both cars and horse-drawn carriages. Train travel is arranged by the Royal Travel Office, which also co-ordinates air transport.

The position of Crown Equerry should not be confused with that of the Equerry: although both are nominally under the Master of the Horse, equerries are effectively independent, performing distinct tasks, and are personal assistants to the Sovereign and senior members of the Royal Family.

The Royal Mews Department

List of Crown Equerries
Lieutenant General Sir George Augustus Quentin 1825–1851
Major John Groves 1854–1859
Lieutenant Colonel Sir George Ashley Maude, KCB 1859–1894
Major General Sir Henry Ewart 1894–1910
Captain Sir Charles Wentworth-FitzWilliam 1910–1924
Colonel Sir Arthur Erskine, GCVO DSO 1924–1941
Colonel Sir Dermot McMorrough Kavanagh, GCVO 1941–1955
Brigadier Walter Sale, CVO OBE 1955–1961 
Lieutenant Colonel Sir John Mansel Miller, GCVO DSO MC 1961–1987
Lieutenant Colonel Charles Stephens, 1987 
Lieutenant Colonel Sir Seymour Gilbart-Denham, KCVO 1987–2002 
Major Felix Wheeler 2002–2005 
Major Simon Robinson LVO 2005–2010
Colonel Toby Browne CVO 2010—

See also
Gentleman of the Horse for a preceding post
Master of the Horse for equivalents in other countries

References

General
Hoey, Brian (1992). All The Queen's Men: Inside The Royal Household. London: HarperCollins. .

Positions within the British Royal Household